Kevin Rodriguez (born September 25, 1996) is an American soccer player who plays as a midfielder.

Early life
He played youth soccer with Manchester United Houston. After originally getting cut by the  Houston Dynamo academy twice, he eventually was accepted to join the academy in 2014.

College career
In 2015, he began attending Northern Illinois University, where he played for the men's soccer team. He scored his first collegiate goal on September 29, 2015 against the Eastern Illinois Panthers. As a freshman, he was named the 2015 MAC Freshman of the Year, and was named to the NIU Adidas Invitational All-Tournament Team. In his senior season in 2018, he was named to the United Soccer Coaches All-North Region Third Team and the All-MAC First Team.

Club career 
In 2017, Rodriguez joined USL Premier Development League side Brazos Valley Cavalry during the college offseason. He made two appearances in 2017 and three appearances in 2018.

In January 2019, Rodriguez was selected 75th overall in the 2019 MLS SuperDraft by Minnesota United, becoming the first Northern Illinois University player to ever be drafted.

In March 2019, Rodriguez signed for USL Championship side Rio Grande Valley FC. He scored his first professional goal on August 10, 2019 against the Colorado Springs Switchbacks.

Rodriguez signed with FC Tucson in USL League One on February 10, 2021. After struggling with injuries early in the 2021 season, he scored his first goal for the club on October 16, 2021, when he scored two goals against South Georgia Tormenta FC in a 3-1 victory. As a result of that performance, he was named to the USL Team of the Week.

Career statistics

Club

References

External links 
 

1996 births
Living people
American soccer players
Association football midfielders
Brazos Valley Cavalry FC players
Minnesota United FC draft picks
Northern Illinois Huskies men's soccer players
People from Pasadena, Texas
Rio Grande Valley FC Toros players
FC Tucson players
Soccer players from Texas
Sportspeople from Harris County, Texas
USL Championship players
USL League Two players
USL League One players